John William Thomas MSM (30 September 1890 – 1947) was an English professional footballer who played in the Football League for Newcastle United as an inside right.

Personal life 
Thomas worked as a miner. After the outbreak of the First World War in August 1914, he enlisted as a lance corporal in the Durham Light Infantry. In 1915, Thomas took part in the Second Battle of Ypres. During the battle, he was taken prisoner of war near Boetleer's Farm and was sent to Germany, where he was incarcerated with French prisoners and learnt the language. He eventually escaped with four other French prisoners and by using a compass which had been hidden in a cake sent from home, he made it to the neutral Netherlands. Upon his return to Britain, Thomas was interrogated as a possible German spy, but was then sent back to France to work in counter-espionage, by posing as a French dock worker in Le Havre and Dieppe. He won the Meritorious Service Medal during the course of his service. After the war, Thomas worked in a mine in Sacriston.

Career statistics

References

1890 births
1947 deaths
People from Sacriston
Footballers from County Durham
English footballers
Association football inside forwards
Spennymoor United F.C. players
Brighton & Hove Albion F.C. players
Newcastle United F.C. players
Northern Football League players
Southern Football League players
English Football League players
British Army personnel of World War I
World War I prisoners of war held by Germany
English miners
English spies
Durham Light Infantry soldiers
World War I spies for the United Kingdom
Recipients of the Meritorious Service Medal (United Kingdom)
Intelligence Corps soldiers
Military personnel from County Durham
British World War I prisoners of war
English escapees
Escapees from German detention